Peter S. Eagleson (27 February 1928 - 6 January 2021) was an American hydrologist, author of Dynamic Hydrology and Ecohydrology: Darwinian Expression of Vegetation Form and Function. He taught at the Massachusetts Institute of Technology since 1952 and was a Professor Emeritus. He held professional positions including member of the National Academy of Engineering (since 1982) and President of the American Geophysical Union from 1986-1988. He won many awards including the Stockholm International Water Institute's World Water Prize in 1997.

Eagleson's research interests include dynamic hydrology, hydroclimatology, and forest ecology. His early research was on sediment transport and wave theory. He published multiple articles and book chapters about these subjects. It was not until 1964 that he significantly narrowed his focus to hydrology. In 1967 Eagleson along with some of his students, published six papers in Water Resources Research. These papers immediately impacted the field of hydrology.

Eagleson taught at MIT since 1952, holding a chair as Professor of Civil and Environmental Engineering since 1965.

Awards
World Water Prize (Stockholm International Water Institute) 1997
William Bowie Medal 1994
James R. Killian Faculty Achievement Award, MIT 1992-1993
International Hydrology Prize 1991
Robert E. Horton Medal 1988

Selected publications 
 Eagleson, P.S. 2004. Ecohydrology. Darwinian Expression of Vegetation Form and Function. Cambridge University Press.
 Eagleson, P.S. 1970. Dynamic hydrology. McGraw-Hill.
Eagleson, P.S. 1978. Climate, Soil, and Vegetation: 1. Introduction to Water Balance Dynamics. Water Resources Research, 14(5), 705–712. https://doi.org/10.1029/WR014i005p00705
Eagleson, P.S. 1978. Climate, Soil, and Vegetation: 2. The Distribution of Annual Precipitation Derived from Observed Storm Sequences. Water Resources Research, 14(5), 713–721. https://doi.org/10.1029/WR014i005p00713
Eagleson, P.S. 1978. Climate, Soil, and Vegetation: 3. A Simplified Model of Soil Moisture Movement in the Liquid Phase. Water Resources Research, 14(5), 722–730. https://doi.org/10.1029/WR014i005p00722
Eagleson, P.S. 1978. Climate, Soil, and Vegetation: 4. The Expected Value of Annual Evapotranspiration. Water Resources Research, 14(5), 731–739. https://doi.org/10.1029/WR014i005p00731
Eagleson, P.S. 1978. Climate, Soil, and Vegetation: 5. A Derived Distribution of Storm Surface Runoff. Water Resources Research, 14(5), 741–748. https://doi.org/10.1029/WR014i005p00741
Eagleson, P.S. 1978. Climate, Soil, and Vegetation: 6. Dynamics of the Annual Water Balance. Water Resources Research, 14(5), 749. https://doi.org/10.1029/WR014i005p00749
Eagleson, P.S. 1978. Climate, Soil, and Vegetation: 7. A Derived Distribution of Annual Water Yield. Water Resources Research, 14(5), 765. https://doi.org/10.1029/WR014i005p00765

References 

1928 births
2021 deaths
Massachusetts Institute of Technology alumni
MIT School of Engineering faculty
Lehigh University alumni
American hydrologists
Environmental engineers
Members of the United States National Academy of Engineering